This is a list of Grade II* listed buildings in Lancashire, England.

Blackburn with Darwen

|}

Blackpool

|}

Burnley

|}

Chorley

|}

Fylde

|}

Hyndburn

|}

Lancaster

|}

Pendle

|}

Preston

|}

Ribble Valley

|}

Rossendale

|}

South Ribble

|}

West Lancashire

|}

Wyre

|}

See also
 :Category:Grade II* listed buildings in Lancashire
 Scheduled monuments in Lancashire

Notes

References 
National Heritage List for England

External links

 
Lancashire
 Grade II*